In mathematics, Ratner's theorems are a group of major theorems in ergodic theory concerning unipotent flows on homogeneous spaces proved by Marina Ratner around 1990. The theorems grew out of Ratner's earlier work on horocycle flows. The study of the dynamics of unipotent flows played a decisive role in the proof of the Oppenheim conjecture by Grigory Margulis. Ratner's theorems have guided key advances in the understanding of the dynamics of unipotent flows. Their later generalizations provide ways to both sharpen the results and extend the theory to the setting of arbitrary semisimple algebraic groups over a local field.

Short description 
The Ratner orbit closure theorem asserts that the closures of orbits of unipotent flows on the quotient of a Lie group by a lattice are nice, geometric subsets. The Ratner equidistribution theorem further asserts that each such orbit is equidistributed in its closure. The Ratner measure classification theorem is the weaker statement that every ergodic invariant probability measure is homogeneous, or algebraic: this turns out to be an important step towards proving the more general equidistribution property. There is no universal agreement on the names of these theorems: they are variously known as the "measure rigidity theorem", the "theorem on invariant measures" and its "topological version", and so on.

The formal statement of such a result is as follows.

Example: 

See also 
 Equidistribution theorem

References

Expositions

Selected original articles 
 
 
 
 
 
 
 

Ergodic theory
Lie groups
Theorems in dynamical systems